The Joy of Sweat: The Strange Science of Perspiration is a popular science book by Sarah Everts, published in 2021 by  W. W. Norton & Company. Featured in NYTimes, WSJ, and Science Friday, this 11-chapter monograph entertainingly describes how sweat is made, the significant benefits perspiration provides for human performance, and the absurdities behind its societal stigmatization.

References 

2021 non-fiction books
English non-fiction books
English-language books
W. W. Norton & Company books
Popular science books